Marinovka is a rural locality (a selo) and the administrative center of Marinovskoye Rural Settlement, Kalachyovsky District, Volgograd Oblast, Russia. The population was 862 as of 2010. There are 16 streets.

The Marinovka Air Base is located to the south west.

Geography 
Marinovka is located 25 km west of Kalach-na-Donu (the district's administrative centre) by road. Prikanalny is the nearest rural locality.

References 

Rural localities in Kalachyovsky District
Don Host Oblast